Baek Joo-Hyun (born February 9, 1984) is a South Korea football player who since November 2008 has played for Suwon Samsung Bluewings.

Career statistics 
As of end of 2008 season

References
K-League player record 
Korean FA Cup match result 

Suwon Samsung Bluewings players
Gimcheon Sangmu FC players
K League 1 players
Association football midfielders
South Korean footballers
1984 births
Living people